Keizaburō, Keizaburo or Keizaburou (written: 圭三郎 or 啓三郎) is a masculine Japanese given name. Notable people with the name include:

, Japanese artist and children's book illustrator

Japanese masculine given names